Dimas Braz Rimi de Oliveira (born April 29, 1987 in Sao Paulo), best known as Dimas, is a Brazilian football striker, who plays for Portuguesa Londrinense in the Brazilian second division.

References

External links
 CBF

1987 births
Living people
People from Ribeirão Preto
Association football forwards
Brazilian footballers
Associação Portuguesa de Desportos players
Associação Portuguesa Londrinense players
Once Municipal footballers
Brazilian expatriate footballers
Expatriate footballers in Romania
Expatriate footballers in El Salvador
Footballers from São Paulo (state)